Sharon L. Coleman (born 1945) was an American politician and businesswoman.

Coleman lived in Spring Lake Park, Minnesota with her husband and family and was self-employed. She went to Augsburg University. Coleman served in the Minnesota House of Representatives in 1983 and 1984 and was a Democrat.

References

1945 births
Living people
People from Spring Lake Park, Minnesota
Augsburg University alumni
Businesspeople from Minnesota
Women state legislators in Minnesota
Democratic Party members of the Minnesota House of Representatives